Joseph Hector Marini (born January 27, 1957) is a Canadian former ice hockey forward.

Born in Timmins, Ontario, Marini started his National Hockey League career with the New York Islanders.  He also played with the New Jersey Devils.  His career lasted from 1979 to 1984.  Marini also played in the 1983 NHL All-Star Game. He won the Stanley Cup with the Islanders in  1981 and 1982.

Marini's career ended with an injury on December 5, 1985 while playing for the Fort Wayne Komets. The injury resulted in the loss of his left eye.

Career statistics

References

External links

Picture of Hector Marini's Name on the 1982 Stanley Cup Plaque

1957 births
Canadian people of Italian descent
Canadian ice hockey forwards
Fort Wayne Komets players
Fort Worth Texans players
Ice hockey people from Ontario
Indianapolis Checkers (CHL) players
Living people
Maine Mariners players
Muskegon Mohawks players
National Hockey League All-Stars
New Jersey Devils players
New York Islanders draft picks
New York Islanders players
Sportspeople from Timmins
Stanley Cup champions
Sudbury Wolves players